Shocking gum is a practical joke device that delivers a mild electric shock. The victim is offered what appears to be the last stick of gum from a box, and touching or pulling this triggers the shock. A few novelty companies have produced these 'Shocking gum' packages since the 1950s. The most popular (fictitious) brands of Shocking Gum are Fruit Juicy and JB. Shocking gum is particularly favored by children and teenagers rather than adults.

In 2005, the US Military reported that insurgents in Iraq were using shock chewing gum as a form of torture, forcing prisoners to bite down on the sticks.

Another closely related prank device is the chewing gum bug, in which a fake plastic bug attached to a metal spring instead “snaps” the hand of the person who attempts to take the piece of gum.

See also 
 List of practical joke topics

References

Practical joke devices